Ganwick House is a late-18th-century house in Wagon Road, Ganwick Corner (Gannic Corner), near Chipping Barnet, England. , it was in use as a residential-care home for men with autism and learning difficulties. It is Grade II listed with Historic England.

References

External links

Grade II listed houses in Hertfordshire
Nursing homes in the United Kingdom